Rovena Stefa (born 27 April 1979, in Fier) is an Albanian singer. Her first album Falling Snow had much success in Europe.

In 2005 and 2006 Rovena had success with the songs "Do You Come With Me", "Wedding", "With Karrocieri Hats", I'm Sweet", " Llokum", "Address Without A Name" and "Slash Dot Dash".

In 2009, she released two videos for the songs "Mall" and "Viva Eagle and Fatherland". The video for "Mall" created a controversy over its eroticism.

In the Summer of 2009 Stefa opened the "Rovena Club"; a discotheque on the coast of Durres.

In 1996, she won an award for the best interpretation song "I Am The Image" (Duet with Heriot Long) at "The Magic Song '99".

In November 2020, she was announced as the n representative in the Turkvision Song Contest 2020 with the song "Zjarr". However, she withdrew from the contest in December 2020.

Albums 
 2002, Bie dëborë
 2003, Paraja
 2004, Dasma
 2006, Llokum
 2008, Lum e Lum

Singles 
 2005, "Mos thuaj" (with Blero)
 2007, "Për një kafe" (with Altin Shira)
 2007, "Xhelozia" (with Duli)
 2008, "Potpuri popullore" (Shpat Kasapi)
 2009, "Rrofte Shqipja dhe Vata
 2020, "Zjarr"

External links 
 Rovena Stefa website

References

1981 births
Living people
People from Fier
21st-century Albanian women singers
Festivali i Këngës contestants